Kapital Network International is a regional network of independent accounting and consulting firms in Turkey, Eurasia and the Middle East. Serving small and medium-sized, growth-oriented international businesses in accounting, tax, legal services, human resources, software and consulting.

History
Founded on 29 January 1997 as Kapital Serbest Muhasebeci Mali Müşavirlik Ltd. Şti. in Istanbul and formerly a member of RSM International. The firms under the umbrella name of Kapital Network International are Kapital SMMM Ltd., Kapital Denetim YMM Ltd., and Kapital Online Ltd.

References 
<Eurasia in the Global Economy >
<Turkey in the Euro Med >
<Corporate tax: State vigilance is a rising investor concern>
<Silk Road Intelligencer >
<Turkey Briefing >
<Mid-tier firm enters into Azerbaijan audit market >

External links 
 kapitalnetwork.com
 kapitalbusinesspartners.com
 kapitalonline.net

Financial services companies of Turkey
Accounting in Turkey
Accounting organizations